The Sayed al-Hashim Mosque ( Masjid as-Sayed Hāshim) is one of the largest and oldest mosques in Gaza, located in the ad-Darrāj Quarter of the Old City, off of al-Wehda Street. The tomb of Hashim ibn Abd al-Manaf, Muhammad's great grandfather who died in Gaza during a trading voyage, is located under the dome of the mosque according to Muslim tradition.

A mosque and hostel have been located at the present site since at least the 12th century CE. The mosque had a madrasa and was a center for religious learning in the 19th and parts of the 20th-century. The mosque was named after Hashim. The Sayed al-Hashim Mosque was frequented by visiting traders from Egypt, Arabia and Morocco.

The existing mosque was built in 1850, on the orders of the Ottoman sultan Abdul Majid. Some of the older materials used in the mosque’s construction were taken from the mosques and other buildings destroyed by Napoleon Bonaparte's troops. The original Ottoman minaret was rebuilt in 1903 and the north and west aisles were also built during the same period. The mausoleum of Hashim is located in the north-western corner of the mosque.

See also
 List of mosques in the State of Palestine

References

Religious buildings and structures completed in 1850
12th-century mosques
19th-century mosques
Mosques in Gaza City